Zachary W. Carter (born March 19, 1950) is an American lawyer who served as Corporation Counsel of New York City under Mayor Bill de Blasio and United States Attorney for the Eastern District of New York under President Bill Clinton. His term as U.S. Attorney was notable for the prosecutions of the police officers in the Abner Louima case, Jordan Belfort, and those involved in the death of Yankel Rosenbaum during the Crown Heights riot of 1991. Between his tenures in government service, Carter was a partner at Dorsey & Whitney.

Carter graduated from Cornell University in 1972, where he participated in the 1969 takeover of Willard Straight Hall, resulting in charges of criminal trespass that were later dismissed. Carter was admitted to the New York Bar and eventually became a judge of the New York City Criminal Court.

References

|-

1950 births
African-American judges
Cornell University alumni
Living people
New York University School of Law alumni
United States Attorneys for the Eastern District of New York
21st-century African-American people
20th-century African-American people